Renfe Class 592 is a class of diesel multiple unit trains built by Macosa and Ateinsa for some Renfe Cercanías commuter railway networks in Spain, as well as various regional services in Spain and Portugal. The first units entered service in 1981. The class 592 was created with passenger comfort and build quality in mind, and to meet the goals of reliability, frequency and punctuality.

Services

Cities and routes
Class 592 units operate in the following cities:
 Murcia/Alicante
 Valencia

Other services

Class 592 units also operate in various regional rail services around Spain and parts of Portugal

Accidents and incidents

On 9 September 2016, a class 592.0 unit was derailed at O Porriño. Four people were killed and 49 injured, seven seriously.

Gallery

See also

Renfe
Cercanías

References

External links
 Technical details

Renfe multiple units
Cercanías